G17 may refer to:

 G17 Plus, a Serbian political party
 , an Auk-class minesweeper of the Mexican Navy
 Bandy World Championship G-17, a sport competition
 County Route G17 (California)
 Glock 17, a firearm
 , an O-class destroyer of the Royal Navy